Blue lettuce, wild blue lettuce, or common blue lettuce can refer to:

 Cicerbita alpina (synonym Lactuca alpina), tall blue lettuce or alpine sow-thistle, native to upland and mountainous parts of Europe
 Lactuca biennis, tall blue lettuce or blue wood lettuce, native to the eastern half of the United States and Canada
 Lactuca canadensis, Florida blue lettuce or Canada blue lettuce, considered to be a native to parts of North America and introduced elsewhere
 Lactuca perennis, blue lettuce, native to Central and Southern Europe
 Lactuca pulchella, blue lettuce, native to North America
 Lactuca tatarica, blue lettuce, native to Europe and Asia